Pamela or Pam O'Connor may refer to 

Pam O'Connor (politician), American politician
Pamela O'Connor (figure skater) (born 1980) British ice dancer